Tarak Chandra Das (1898–1964) was an anthropologist of Calcutta University. He did his Masters' from Calcutta University in ‘Ancient Indian History and Culture’ and joined the  then newly founded Department of Anthropology at Calcutta University (the first Department of Anthropology in India) in 1921 as a research scholar and then he became lecturer in 1923 and finally retired as a Reader from the Department in 1963. Das conducted extensive fieldworks in Chotanagpur in the then Bihar and in Assam.

Contributions
Das was interested in the application of Anthropology. In 1941, he delivered the Sectional Presidential address in the Anthropology Section of the Indian Science Congress on the  ‘Cultural Anthropology in the Service of the Individual and the Nation’.  In the address, Das elaborately charted out the future path of Indian anthropology with a  description of the social dynamics of the tribal and peasant societies in India in the context of the role of anthropologists in nation building.
Two books written by T.C. Das bears testimony of his  observation and collection of data through anthropological fieldwork. One is his monograph on the Purum Kuki tribe of north-eastern India. and the other is on the Great Bengal Famine during the Second World War.[Bengal famine (1943):As revealed in a survey of the destitutes of Calcutta, 1949]. Both the books were published by the University of Calcutta. Northeast India provided windows for Das in his applied anthropological approach  towards nation building.

The Purum monograph was one of the most comprehensive works produced by an anthropologist on the life of a small tribe and it became a major source of data for a number of world-renowned social anthropologists of Great Britain and USA in later years.
The book on the famine of Bengal which took place in 1943 was a unique and rare first-hand study done by any anthropologist or social scientist on the victims of one of the greatest tragedies of India under the colonial rule. An earlier version of the book was discussed in the then British Parliament and some of the recommendations advanced by Das were adopted by the Famine Inquiry Commission in 1944 formed by the colonial government for the prevention of future famines in India. The Nobel Laureate economist Amartya Sen cited Das’s original work in his famous book Poverty and Famines. Throughout the book, one finds description by Das wherein dry quantitative data, graphs and tables were made alive with human stories of ‘grim struggles between hunger and finer sentiments of love, affection and kindness’ Das had conducted intensive fieldwork among three tribes in eastern India, viz. Ho, Kharia and Bhumij during 1927–31 and had shown how these tribes maintained their sociocultural identities.
Apart from his success as an ethnographer, Das was also an armchair anthropologist. His studies on culture around fish in Bengal, museums and dowry restriction law provided examples of his keen interest in dealing with archival materials and written texts in social anthropological and sociological studies.

References

1898 births
1964 deaths
Indian anthropologists
20th-century anthropologists